Quake II is a 1997 first-person shooter video game developed by id Software and published by Activision. It is the second installment of the Quake series, but not a direct sequel to Quake. The game's storyline is continued in its expansions and Quake 4.

The soundtrack for Quake II was mainly provided by Sonic Mayhem, with some additional tracks by Bill Brown; the main theme was also composed by Bill Brown and Rob Zombie, and one track by Jer Sypult. The soundtrack for the Nintendo 64 version of the game was composed by Aubrey Hodges, credited as Ken "Razor" Richmond.

Gameplay

Quake II is a first-person shooter, in which the player shoots enemies from the perspective of the main character. The gameplay is very similar to that featured in Quake, in terms of movement and controls, although the player's movement speed has been slowed down, and the player now has the ability to crouch. The game retains four of the eight weapons from Quake (the Shotgun, Super Shotgun, Grenade Launcher, and Rocket Launcher), although they have been redesigned visually and made to function in slightly different ways. The remainder of Quakes eight weapons (the Axe, Nailgun, Super Nailgun, and Thunderbolt) are not present in Quake II. The six newly introduced weapons are the Blaster, Machine Gun, Chain Gun, Hyperblaster, Railgun, and BFG10K. The Quad Damage power up from Quake is present in Quake II, and new power-ups include the Ammo Pack, Invulnerability, Bandolier, Enviro-Suit, Rebreather, and Silencer.

The single player game features a number of changes from Quake. First, the player is given mission-based objectives that correspond to the storyline, including stealing a Tank Commander's head to open a door and calling down an air-strike on a bunker. CGI cutscenes are used to illustrate the player's progress through the main objectives, although they are all essentially the same short piece of video, showing a computerized image of the player character as he moves through game's levels. Another addition is the inclusion of a non-hostile character type: the player character's captured comrades. It is not possible to interact with these characters, however, as they have all been driven insane by their Strogg captors.

The game features much larger levels than Quake, with many more wide open areas. There is also a hub system that allows the player to travel back and forth between levels, which is necessary to complete certain objectives. Some of the textures and symbols that appear in the game are very similar to some of those found in Quake. Enemies demonstrate visible wounds after they have taken damage.

Multiplayer
The multiplayer portion is similar to that of Quake. It can be played as a free-for-all deathmatch game mode, a cooperative version of the single-player game, or as a 1 vs 1 match that is used in official tournaments, like the Cyberathlete Professional League. It can also be played in Capture the Flag mode (CTF).
The deathmatch game benefited from the release of eight specifically designed levels that id Software added after the game's initial release. They were introduced to the game via one of the early patches, that were released free of charge. Prior to the release of these maps, players were limited to playing multiplayer games on the single-player levels, which, while functional as multiplayer levels, were not designed with deathmatch gameplay specifically in mind.

As in Quake, it is possible to customize the way in which the player appears to other people in multiplayer games. However, whereas in Quake, the only option was to change the color of the player's uniform unless third party modifications were used, now the game comes with a selection of three different player models: a male marine, a female marine, and a male cyborg; choice of player model also affects the speech effects the player's character will make, such as exhaling in effort while jumping or groaning when injured. Each model can be customized from in the in-game menu via the selection of pre-drawn skins, which differ in many ways; for example, skin color, camouflage style, and application of facepaint.

Plot
Quake II takes place in a science fiction environment. In the single-player game, the player assumes the role of a Marine named Bitterman taking part in "Operation Alien Overlord", a desperate attempt to prevent an alien invasion of Earth by launching a pre-emptive attack against the home planet of the hostile Strogg civilization. Most of the other soldiers are captured or killed as soon as they approach the planned landing zone. Bitterman survives because another Marine's personal capsule collided with his upon launch, causing him to crash far short of the landing zone. Bitterman fights his way through the Strogg city, destroying strategic objectives along the way, and finally kills the Strogg leader, the Makron in his orbital asteroid base.

Development

Originally, Quake II was supposed to be an entirely new game and IP; titles like "Strogg", "Lock and Load", and even just "Load" were toyed with in the early days of development. But after numerous failed attempts, the team at id decided to stick with 'Quake II' and forgo the Gothic Lovecraftian horror theme from the original in favor of a more sci-fi aesthetic.

The game was developed with 13 person team. Activision obtained the worldwide distribution rights to the game in May 1997. Artist and co-owner Adrian Carmack had said that Quake II is his favorite game in the series because "it was different and a cohesive project". This is also the last id Software game to feature American McGee before he was fired shortly after its release.

Unlike Quake, where hardware-accelerated graphics controllers were supported only with later patches, Quake II came with OpenGL support out of the box. Later downloads from id Software added support for AMD's 3DNow! instruction set for improved performance on their K6-2 processors, and Rendition released a native renderer for their V1000 graphics chip. The latest version is 3.21. This update includes numerous bug fixes and new levels designed for multiplayer deathmatch. Version 3.21, available as source code on id Software's FTP server, has no improved functionality over version 3.20 and is simply a slight modification to make compiling for Linux easier.

Quake II uses an improved client–server model introduced in Quake. The game code of Quake II, which defines all the functionality for weapons, entities, and game mechanics, can be changed in any way because id Software published the source code of their own implementation that shipped with the game. Quake II uses the shared library functionality of the operating system to load the game library at run-time—this is how mod authors are able to alter the game and provide different gameplay mechanics, new weapons, and much more. The full source code to Quake II version 3.19 was released under the terms of the GNU GPL-2.0-or-later on December 22, 2001. Version 3.21 followed later. An LCC-friendly version was released on January 1, 2002, by a modder going by the name of Major Bitch.

Since the release of the Quake II source code, several updates from third-party projects to the game engine have been created; the most prominent of these are projects focused on graphical enhancements to the game such as most notable "Yamagi Quake II", Quake2maX, EGL, Quake II Evolved, and KMQuake II. The source release also revealed numerous security flaws which can result in remote compromise of both the Quake II client and server. As id Software no longer maintains Quake II, most third-party engines include fixes for these bugs. The unofficial patch 3.24 that fixes bugs and adds only meager tweaks is recommended for Quake II purists, as it is not intended to add new features or be an engine mod in its own right. The most popular server-side engine modification for multiplayer, R1Q2, is generally recommended as a replacement for the 3.20 release for both clients and servers. In July 2003, Vertigo Software released a port of Quake II for the Microsoft .NET platform, using Managed C++, called Quake II .NET. It became a poster application for the language, showcasing the powerful interoperability between .NET and standard C++ code. It remains one of the top downloads on the Visual C++ website. In May 2004, Bytonic Software released a port of Quake II (called Jake2) written in Java using JOGL. In 2010 Google ported Jake2 to HTML5, running in Safari and Chrome.

Quake IIs game engine was a popular license and formed the basis for several commercial and free games, such as CodeRED: Alien Arena, War§ow, SiN, Anachronox, Heretic II, Daikatana, Soldier of Fortune, Kingpin: Life of Crime, and UFO: Alien Invasion. Valve's 1998 video game Half-Life used the Quake II engine during early development stages. However, the final version runs on a heavily modified version of the Quake engine, GoldSrc, with a small amount of the Quake II code.

Ports
Ports of Quake II were released in 1999 on the Nintendo 64 (ported by Raster Productions) and PlayStation (ported by HammerHead) video game consoles. In both cases, the core gameplay was largely identical; however, changes were made to the game sequence and split-screen multiplayer replaced network or Internet play. A Macintosh port was developed by Logicware and released in July 1999. Quake II: Colossus (Quake II with both official add-ons) was ported to Linux by id Software and published by Macmillan Digital Publishing in 1999. Be Inc. officially ported Quake II: Colossus to the BeOS to test their OpenGL acceleration in 1999, and provided the game files for free download at a later date—a Windows, Macintosh, or Linux install CD was required to install the game, with the official add-ons being optional.

The PlayStation version contains abridged versions of Units 1, 3, 6, 7, 8, and 10 of the PC version, redesigned to meet the console's technical limitations. For example, many short airlock-like corridors were added to maps to provide loading pauses inside what were contiguous areas in the PC version. In addition, part of the first mission of the N64 port is used as a prologue. Some enemy types were removed and two new enemies was added: the Arachnid, a human-spider cyborg with twin railgun arms, and the Guardian, a bipedal boss enemy. Saving the game is only possible between levels and at mid-level checkpoints where the game loads, while in the PC version the game could be saved and loaded at any time. The game supports the PlayStation Mouse peripheral to provide a greater parity with the PC version's gameplay. The music used in this port is a combination of the Quake II original music score and tracks from the PC version's mission packs, while the opening and closing cut-scenes are taken from the Ground Zero expansion pack.

The PlayStation version uses a new engine developed by HammerHead for their future PlayStation projects and runs at a 512x240 resolution at 30 frames per second. The developer was keen to retain a visual parity with the PC version and avoid tricks such as the use of environmental fog. Colored lights for levels and enemies, and yellow highlights for gunfire and explosions, are carried across from the PC version, with the addition of lens flare effects located around the light sources on the original lightmaps. There is no skybox; instead, a flat Gouraud-textured purple "sky" is drawn across the ceiling. The game uses particles to render blood, debris, and rail gun beams analogously to the PC version.

There is also a split-screen multiplayer mode for two to four players (a four player game is possible using the PlayStation's Multi-tap). The only available player avatar is a modified version of the male player avatar from the PC version, the most noticeable difference being the addition of a helmet. Players can only customize the color of their avatar's armor and change their name. The twelve multiplayer levels featured are unique to the PlayStation version, with none of the PC multiplayer maps being carried over.

The Nintendo 64 version has completely different single player levels and multiplayer maps, and features multiplayer support for up to four players. This version also has new lighting effects, mostly seen in gunfire, and also uses the Expansion Pak for extra graphical detail. This port also features an entirely new soundtrack, consisting mostly of dark ambient pieces, composed by Aubrey Hodges.

A port of Quake II was included with Quake 4 for the Xbox 360 on a bonus disc. This is a direct port of the original game, with some graphical improvements. The port allows for System Link play for up to sixteen players, split-screen for four players, and cooperative play in single-player for up to sixteen players or four players with split-screen alone.

Unofficial
In December 2018, Polish programmer Krzysztof Kondrak released the original Quake 2 v3.21 source code with Vulkan support added. The port, called vkQuake2, is available under the GPLv2.

Mods
As with the original Quake, Quake II was designed to allow players to easily create custom content. A large number of mods, maps, graphics such as player models and skins, and sound effects were created and distributed to others free of charge via the Internet. Popular websites such as PlanetQuake and Telefragged allowed players to gain access to custom content. Another improvement over Quake was that it was easier to select custom player models, skins, and sound effects because they could be selected from an in-game menu.

Mods for the game include Action Quake from 1999. PC Gaming Worlds Simon Quirk wrote of the game, "The Action Quake team fancied a multiplayer-only total conversion of Quake II where strategy, accuracy, and cool-looking fights would dominate."

Release
Quake II released on December 9, 1997, in the United States (one day short of the release of Doom four years prior) and on December 12 in Europe. Despite the title, Quake II is a sequel to the original Quake in name only. The scenario, enemies, and theme are entirely separate and do not fall into the same continuity as Quake. id initially wanted to set it separately from Quake, but due to legal reasons (most of their suggested names were already taken), they decided to use the working title. Quake II was also adopted as a name to leverage the popularity of Quake according to Jennell Jaquays. Quake II has been released on Steam, but this version does not include the soundtrack. The game was released on a bonus disc included with Quake 4 Special Edition for the PC, along with both expansion packs. This version also lacks the soundtrack. Quake II is also available on a bonus disc with the Xbox 360 version of Quake 4. This version is a direct port featuring the original soundtrack and multiplayer maps.

In 2015, Quake II: Quad Damage, a bundle containing the original game with the mission packs has been released at GOG.com, but unlike the previous releases, this one contains a new customizeable launcher and the official soundtrack in OGG format which was made possible to play in-game, making it the only digital release to include music.

The game has also been included in the following official compilations:

 Quake II: Quad Damage – contains Quake II and all three official expansion packs.
 Quake II: Colossus – a compilation for Linux that contains Quake II and both mission packs.
 Ultimate Quake – a compilation including the original Quake trilogy.

Quake II RTX
A remastered version of the game, titled Quake II RTX was announced by Nvidia in March 2019 and was released on June 6 for Windows and Linux on Steam. This remastered version requires either a Nvidia RTX or an AMD Radeon RX 6000 series GPU to utilize these cards' hardware ray-tracing functionality, but a software fallback is available for graphics cards that are fast enough.
The game, provided free of charge, includes the three levels present in the original Quake II demo, but can be used to play the full game if its data files are available. Unlike in most games, ray tracing is used extensively here for lighting, reflections, etc. This is only possible because of the otherwise low hardware demands of Quake II.

Expansions

Quake II Mission Pack: The Reckoning
Quake II Mission Pack: The Reckoning is the first official expansion pack, released on May 27, 1998. It was developed by Xatrix Entertainment. First announced in January 1998, it features eighteen new single player levels, six new deathmatch levels, three new weapons (the Ion Ripper, Phalanx Particle Cannon, and Trap), a new power-up, two new enemies, seven modified versions of existing enemies, and five new music tracks. The storyline follows Joker, a member of an elite squad of marines on a mission to infiltrate a Strogg base on one of Stroggos' moons and destroy the Strogg fleet, which is preparing to attack. Joker crash lands in the swamps outside of the compound where his squad is waiting. He travels through the swamps and bypasses the compounds outer defenses and enters through the main gate, finding his squad just in time to watch them get executed by Strogg forces. Next, Joker escapes on his own to the fuel refinery where he helps the Air Force destroy all fuel production, then infiltrates the Strogg spaceport, boards a cargo ship and reaches the Moon Base, destroying it and the Strogg fleet. Notably, the section of the game that takes place on the Moon Base has low gravity, something that was previously used on one secret level of the original Quake.

The Reckoning received mixed reviews. It holds 69.50% from Gamerankings and GameSpot given a score of 7.4/10.

Quake II Mission Pack: Ground Zero
Quake II Mission Pack: Ground Zero is the second official expansion pack, released on September 11, 1998. It was developed by Rogue Entertainment. It comes with fourteen new single-player levels, ten new multiplayer maps, five additional music tracks, five new enemies, seven new power-ups, and five new weapons. In the expansion's story the Gravity Well has trapped the Earth Fleet in orbit above the planet Stroggos. One of the marines who managed to land, Stepchild, must now make his way to the Gravity Well to destroy it and free the fleet above and disable the entire defenses of the planet.

Ground Zero received average to mixed reviews. It holds 65.40% from Gamerankings. Patrick Baggatta of IGN gave the expansion 7.5/10, describing it as similar to the original, but noting occasionally confusing map design. Elliott Chin of GameSpot gave the game 7.9/10, citing it as decent for an expansion and praising the monsters and enhanced AI. Johnny B. of Game Revolution rated the expansion D+, citing bad level design and few additions to the original game, and noted the multiplayer power-up gameplay as the only fun feature.

Quake II Netpack I: Extremities
Quake II Netpack I: Extremities contains, among other features, 11 game mods and 12 deathmatch maps.

Reception

Sales
Quake II entered PC Data's monthly computer game sales rankings at #2 for December 1997, behind Riven. The game's sales in the United States alone reached 240,913 copies by the end of 1997, after its release on December 9. According to PC Data, it was the country's 22nd-best-selling computer game of 1997. The following year, Quake II secured fifth place on PC Data's charts for January and February 1998, then dropped to #8 in March and #9 in April. It remained in PC Data's top 20 for another two months, before exiting in July 1998. Quake II surpassed 850,000 units shipped to retailers by April 1998, and 900,000 by June.

According to PC Data, Quake II was the United States' 14th-best-selling computer game during the January–November 1998 period. It ultimately secured 15th place for the full year, with sales of 279,536 copies and revenues of $12.6 million. GameDaily reported in January 1999 that Quake IIs sales in the United States had reached 550,000 units; this number rose to 610,000 units by December of that year. Worldwide, Quake II sold over 1 million copies by 2002.

Critical reviews

Quake II received generally positive reviews across all platforms.

Next Generation reviewed the PC version of the game and stated that "all in all, id should be commended for the advancement of its technology and improvement in its single-player level design, but it's going to be up to mod designers to provide the necessary additions to the multiplayer game in order to make it stand out from Quake." GamePro said the game "lives up to its impossibly high hype." Praising its interconnected levels, new weapons, enemy design, soundtrack, and the ability to play as a female character in multiplayer mode (which they called "an overdue nod to the growing number of QuakeGrrls"), they gave it a perfect 5.0 out of 5 in all four categories (graphics, sound, control, and funfactor).

On aggregating review website GameRankings, the PC version held 87%, the Nintendo 64 version 81%, and the PlayStation version 80%. AllGame editor Michael L. House stated, "the beauty of Quake II is not in the single-player game, it's in the multi-player feature." GameSpot editor Vince Broady described Quake II as "the only first-person shooter to render the original Quake entirely obsolete."

Daniel Erickson reviewed the N64 version of the game for Next Generation, and stated that "a good first-person shooter with a great multiplayer mode; GoldenEye is no longer the only game in town."

Quake II won Macworlds 1999 "Best Shoot-'Em-Up" award, and the magazine's Christopher Breen wrote: "In either single-player or multiplayer mode, for careening-through-corridor-carnage satisfaction, Quake II is a must-have." It also won Computer Gaming Worlds 1997 "Action Game of the Year" award. The editors wrote that "for pure adrenaline-pumping, visceral, instantly gratifying action, Quake II is the hands-down winner. No game gave us the rush that Quake II did".

In 1998, PC Gamer declared it the 3rd-best computer game ever released, and the editors called it "id's gun-happy masterpiece is the most sensational and subtle shooter ever, and one of the best games of any type ever created."

In 1999, Next Generation listed Quake 2 as number 5 on their "Top 50 Games of All Time", commenting that, "Quake 2 is the standard for multiplayer shooting, and we've yet to see a "Quake killer" that can keep us from returning to multiplayer Quake for longer than a month or so."

Notes

References

External links
 
 
 Quake II at PlanetQuake
 Quake II at MobyGames

1997 video games
Activision games
BeOS games
Classic Mac OS games
Commercial video games with freely available source code
Cooperative video games
D.I.C.E. Award for Action Game of the Year winners
Esports games
First-person shooters
Id Software games
Id Tech games
Interactive Achievement Award winners
Multiplayer online games
Nintendo 64 games
PlayStation (console) games
Quake (series)
Science fiction video games
Split-screen multiplayer games
Video game sequels
Video games developed in the United States
Video games scored by Aubrey Hodges
Video games scored by Sascha Dikiciyan
Video games set on fictional planets
Video games with expansion packs
Windows games